Mood Valiant is the third studio album by Australian neo-soul quartet Hiatus Kaiyote, released in 2021 on Brainfeeder. The album peaked at number 4 on the ARIA charts.

At the 2021 ARIA Music Awards, the album was nominated for Best Soul/R&B Release.

At the 2021 Music Victoria Awards, the album was nominated for Best Victorian Album.

At the AIR Awards of 2022, the album won Best Independent Jazz Album or EP.

Background
Singer/guitarist Nai Palm revealed on 18 October 2018 that she had been diagnosed with breast cancer. She composed many of the songs that would later appear on Mood Valiant during the period of her treatment and noted how her diagnoses changed her perspective on life, a theme explored on the album.

The title of the album was inspired by Nai Palm's mother, who owned two Valiant Safari station wagons, one white and one black, and would drive whichever would suit her mood for the day.

Critical reception

Mood Valiant received critical acclaim, with critics praising their emotional richness, arrangement, effortless melodies, soulful vocals, and liveliness. At Metacritic, which assigns a normalized rating out of 100 to reviews from mainstream publications, the album received an average score of 84 based on 7 sources, indicating "universal acclaim".

Pitchfork reviewer Aldan Jackson felt that Mood Valiant was "the first Hiatus Kaiyote album that doesn’t sound like merely a recorded live set" and "their best album yet". Tyler Jenke of Rolling Stone described the album as containing "hypnotic, almost kaleidoscopic compositions". Rebecca Sibley of Clash said that the album is "a strong follow-up to Choose Your Weapon and a perfect soundtrack for the summer" with its "rich, colourful soundscapes, tropical atmosphere, and lead singer Nai Palm’s soulful voice".

Awards and nominations

Track listing

Personnel
 Nai Palm – guitar, vocals
 Paul Bender – bass
 Simon Mavin – keyboards
 Perrin Moss – drums

Charts

References

2021 albums
Hiatus Kaiyote albums